Alessandro Lami (Rosignano Marittimo, 27 January 1949 - 8 March 2015) was an Italian classical philologist.

Life 
Born to the workman Pietro Lami and his wife Rina Colombini he grew up in Castiglioncello and was schooled in the knowledge of Latin and Classical Greek at the Liceo Classico "Niccolini Guerrazzi" in Livorno where he firstmeets his wife, Elisabetta Piccioni.

Having received a scholarship from the Scuola Normale Superiore, he eventually finishes his studies at the University of Pisa, where his academic mentor is Vincenzo di Benedetto. There he teaches Greek Literature, first as an assistant professor, than as an associate professor.

He keeps with his research until shortly before his death, collaborating with Galenos, journal of philology of medical texts directed by his friend and coworker Ivan Garofalo.

He died in the morning of 8 March 2015 next to his wife.

His ashes rest in Castiglioncello sea.

Achievements 
His areas of expertise included the history of Greek Philosophy, history of Greek Medicine and Hippocratic Corpus. His work, with comment and translation, of Galenic treatise De opinionibus propriis, is considered the best.

References 
5. L. Benelli, Un profilo ed un ricordo di Alessandro Lami, Lexis 34 (2016), pp. 1–8. (in Italian)

Italian philologists
1949 births
2015 deaths